The 2013–14 FAW Welsh Cup was the 127th season of the annual knockout tournament for competitive football teams in Wales. The tournament commenced on 16 August 2013, and ran until the final in May 2014. The final itself featured Aberystwyth Town for the fourth time, the last being in 2009, and The New Saints for the seventh time, the last being in 2012. They had never faced each other in a final before. The final was won 3−2 by The New Saints, who made the Double and qualified to the first qualifying round of the 2014–15 UEFA Europa League. Aberystwyth Town qualified to the first qualifying round of the 2014–15 UEFA Europa League as the cup runner-up.

Qualifying round one
Qualifying Round One was played on either Saturday 17 or Sunday 18 August 2013.

|}

|}

Qualifying round two
Qualifying Round Two was played on either Saturday 14 or Sunday 15 September 2013.

|}

|}

Round one
Round One was played on Saturday 12 October 2013.

|}

|}

Round two
Round Two was played on Saturday 9 November 2013.

|}

|}

Round three
Round Three was played on Saturday 7 December 2013.

|}

22 November 2013 - Caldicot Town (3) withdrawn from the competition for fielding an un-registered player in Round 2.

Round Four
Round Four was played on either Saturday 1 or Sunday 2 February 2014.

|}

Quarter-finals
The Quarter-finals were played on 1 March 2014.

Semi-finals
The Semi-finals were played on 5 April 2014.

Final

References

External links
2013–14 Welsh Cup at Soccerway
1 https://web.archive.org/web/20131202223426/http://www.penybontfc.co.uk/news/details.php?news_id=9318#news

2013-14
1